Ivanovskaya is a rural locality (a village) in Noginskoye Rural Settlement, Syamzhensky District, Vologda Oblast, Russia. The population was 11 as of 2002.

Geography 
Ivanovskaya is located 21 km north of Syamzha (the district's administrative centre) by road. Chaglotovo is the nearest rural locality.

References 

Rural localities in Syamzhensky District